AFLD may refer to:

 Alcoholic fatty liver disease, fatty liver disease caused by overconsumption of alcohol
 Agence française de lutte contre le dopage, the French anti-doping agency